This is a list of notable Internet chess servers.

Active
 Chess.com
 Lichess
 Chess24
 Caissa.com 
 ChessBase
 FIDE Online Arena
 Free Internet Chess Server
 Internet Chess Club
 Kasparov Chess
 Playchess
 SchemingMind

Defunct
 ChessCube
 Chess Live
 KasparovChess.com — same domain as used by Kasparov Chess but launched in the early 2000s
 World Chess Network

References

Chess websites

Internet protocols
Internet chess servers
Online games